Andhra Pradesh celebrates many religious festivals and has few holidays. Ugadi and Sankranti (Pedda Panduga) are the most significant festivals in the state. Festivals celebrated/observed by a considerable population are only listed here.

Major religious festivals

Annual

Non-annual

Minor religious festivals

References 

Festivals in India by state or union territory
Festivals in India
Festivals in Andhra Pradesh
Andhra Pradesh-related lists
Lists of festivals in India